Gary P. Pisano is an American economist currently the Harry E. Figgie Professor of Business Administration at Harvard Business School.

Education
Ph.D., Business Administration, University of California, Berkeley, 1988 
B.A., magna cum laude, Economics (with distinction), Yale University, 1983

References

External links 

Year of birth missing (living people)
Living people
Harvard Business School faculty
Haas School of Business alumni
Yale University alumni
20th-century American non-fiction writers
20th-century American economists
21st-century American non-fiction writers
21st-century American economists